Julio César Ortegon (born 1 December 1968) is a Colombian racing cyclist. He rode in the 1992 Tour de France.

References

1968 births
Living people
Colombian male cyclists
Place of birth missing (living people)